The 2020 European Mountain Bike Championships was the 33rd edition of the European Mountain Bike Championships, an annual mountain biking competition organized by the Union Européenne de Cyclisme (UEC). The championships was held in Monteceneri, Switzerland on from 15 to 18 October 2022.

Medal summary

Cross-country

Cross-country eliminator

Team Relay

Medal table

References

European Mountain Bike Championships
European Mountain Bike Championships
European Mountain Bike Championships
International cycle races hosted by Switzerland
Sport in Ticino